Alabama Live is the first live album by the American band Alabama. Their first live compilation, it was released in 1988 and was a Number One album on Top Country Albums. The album includes live renditions of various singles from the band's career, as well as the album tracks "Red River", "Fireworks" and "Gonna Have a Party". Also included is a cover of the Marshall Tucker Band's "Can't You See", which Alabama had never included on any of their studio albums.

Track listing

Side One
"Can't Keep a Good Man Down" (Bob Corbin) – 3:44
"Tennessee River" (Randy Owen) – 7:48
"Take Me Down" (J.P. Pennington, Mark Gray) – 4:50
"Love in the First Degree" (Jim Hurt, Tim DuBois) – 2:56
"Red River" (Bud McGuire, George Pearce) – 4:04
"Dixieland Delight" (Ronnie Rogers) – 5:10
"Lady Down on Love" (Owen) – 3:51

Side Two
"If You're Gonna Play in Texas (You Gotta Have a Fiddle in the Band)" (Dan Mitchell, Murry Kellum) – 3:32
"Fireworks" (Ronnie Scaife, Phil Thomas, Kenny Durham) – 3:58
"When We Make Love/There's No Way" ("When We Make Love" by Lisa Palas, Will Robinson, John Jarrard; "There's No Way" by Troy Seals, Mentor Williams) – 3:31
"Gonna Have a Party" (Bruce Channel, Kieran Kane, Cliff Cochran) – 5:32
"Can't You See" (Toy Caldwell) – 7:41
"My Home's in Alabama" (Owen, Teddy Gentry) – 8:16

Personnel

Alabama 
 Jeff Cook – keyboards, electric guitar, fiddle, vocals
 Randy Owen – electric guitar, vocals
 Teddy Gentry – bass guitar, vocals
 Mark Herndon – drums

Guest musicians 
 Costo Davis – keyboards
 Joe "Dixie" Fuller – percussion

Production 
 Alabama – producers
 Harold Shedd – producer 
 Dave Hewitt – recording engineer 
 Kooster McAllister – recording engineer 
 Jim Cotton – mix engineer 
 Paul Goldberg – mix engineer 
 Joe Scaife – mix engineer 
 David Zammit – additional live and mix engineer 
 Ed "K-9" Celletti – assistant engineer 
 Phil Gitomer – assistant engineer 
 Peter Hefter – assistant engineer 
 Robert Kinkle – assistant engineer 
 Fritz Lang – assistant engineer 
 J.B. Matteotti – assistant engineer
 Milan Bogdan – digital editing
 Benny Quinn – digital editing, mastering 
 Masterfonics (Nashville, Tennessee) – mastering location 
 Kym Juister – art production 
 Mary Hamilton – art direction, design 
 Jim "Señor" McGuire – photography 
 Charlie McGallen – hand tinting
 Cheryle Riddle – hair stylist 
 Ann Payne Rice – make-up

Charts

Weekly charts

Year-end charts

Certifications

Sources

Alabama (American band) albums
Albums produced by Harold Shedd
1988 live albums
RCA Records live albums